Angkor: Cambodia Express (also known as Kampuchea Express) is a 1982 Thai-Italian adventure-action film produced and directed by Lek Kitiparaporn and starring Robert Walker Jr. and Christopher George.

Premise
The setting for the film is in the Cambodian period following the withdrawal of the United States two years prior. In this period when Pol Pot reigned, a journalist is searching for his Vietnamese lover who is missing.

Cast  
 Robert Walker Jr. as Andrew Cameron 
 Christopher George as MacArthur 
 Woody Strode as Woody  
 Nancy Kwan as Sue 
 Sorapong Chatree as Montri 
 Lui Leung Wai as Mitr Saren 
 Nit Alisa as Mieng
 Suchao Pongwilai as Montri

Release 
American audiences didn't see a release of the film until it was released on video in 1986.

See also
 List of Italian films of 1982
 List of Thai films

References

External links
  
 

1982 films
1980s action adventure films
English-language Italian films
English-language Thai films
Italian action adventure films
Films scored by Stelvio Cipriani
Thai action films
1980s English-language films
1980s Italian films